Catephia metaleuca is a species of moth of the  family Erebidae. It is found in Kenya.

References

Endemic moths of Kenya
Catephia
Moths described in 1926
Moths of Africa